Mackville is an unincorporated community in Outagamie County, Wisconsin, United States. It is located in the town of Center, three miles north of the City of Appleton. It is a part of the Appleton, Wisconsin Metropolitan Statistical Area, which is a part of the Fox Cities metropolitan area.

Mackville is the location of the Mackville Nationals Truck and Tractor Pull.

Education 
Mackville has one school, a parochial school. Saint Edward's School serves as a preschool for the area.

In popular culture 
Tom Thiel released a song in 2021 called "Unincorporated Town", which references his hometown of Mackville,WI.

References

Further reading 
 Gross, Nicholas L. One Hundred Years of Mackville, 1849–1949: Historical Essays. 1949.
 Gross, Nicholas L. In the Second Hundred Years of Mackville, 1949–1959: Historical Essays. 1959.
 Gross, Nicholas L. Mackville History Continued, 1959–1964: Historical Essays. 1965.
 Gross, Nicholas L. Mackville History Continued, 1964–1970: Historical Essays. 1970.

External links 
Mackville, Wisconsin

Unincorporated communities in Outagamie County, Wisconsin
Unincorporated communities in Wisconsin